Soboš is a village and municipality in Svidník District in the Prešov Region of north-eastern Slovakia.

History
In historical records the village was first mentioned in 1390. After the first census which took place in 1787, it was found that the village had 37 houses and a population of 264.

Geography
The municipality lies at an altitude of 210 metres and covers an area of 7.168 km². It has a population of 145 people.

References

External links
 
 

Villages and municipalities in Svidník District
Šariš